The Southern African rock python (Python natalensis) is a large python species native to Southern Africa inhabiting savanna and woodland. It was first described by Andrew Smith in 1833.

Description

The Southern African rock python has a colouration that is similar to its northern relative, however it is described as being "drabber". Below the light stripe on both snakes' head, the southern species has a narrower dark patch that resembles a stripe instead of a patch. The Central African rock python (Python sebae) has two prominent light lines from the nose, over the eye to the back of the head, which are much duller in the Southern African rock python. The northern species has considerably larger head scales. It is also noticeably inferior in size to size the Central African rock python.

Size

Regarding body length and mass, this species exhibits sexual dimorphism, as females are significantly larger and heavier than males. There is one reliable record of a living specimen reaching . The longest South African python measured , recorded in the former Transvaal.

References

Python (genus)
Reptiles described in 1833
Snakes of Africa